BK Das was a bureaucrat and adviser, with the rank of minister, of Shahabuddin Ahmed caretaker government.

Early life
Das was born in 1943 in Sylhet, East Bengal, British India. He graduated from the University of Dhaka.

Career
Das was a judge in the Bangladesh High Court for 12 years. He would then serve in the Bangladesh Supreme Court, Appellate Division. In 2010 he was appointed the chairman of Bangladesh Press Council.

Death
Das died on 12 June 2014.

References

1943 births
2015 deaths
Bangladeshi judges
Bangladeshi Hindus
University of Dhaka alumni
Advisors of Caretaker Government of Bangladesh